Sant Salvador de Breda is a parish church and former Benedictine monastery in Breda, Province of Girona, Catalonia, Spain.

Architecture and fittings

Very little of the original Romanesque architecture remains. The 11th-12th century bell tower, reconstructed later, is the best preserved building. It is a slender tower,  in height, and rectangular in shape. It consists of five floors with windows in the top four.

The Gothic-style church, built between the 14th and 16th centuries, serves as parish church. It has a late Romanesque cloister which was partially destroyed in 1877. Annexed to the cloister is an ancient abbey house with large patio windows and Gothic arches. The tombs of the nobles who were buried in the monastery were desecrated and plundered; little remains of them. 

The adjoining church of Santa Maria is now a municipal museum.

References

Pladevall, Antoni; Els monestirs catalans, Ediciones Destino, Barcelona, 1970 
Tomàs Bonell, Jordi; Descobrir Catalunya, Premsa catalana, Barcelona, 1994.

External links 

 Monestir de Sant Salvador de Breda - Monestirs de Catalunya

Benedictine monasteries in Catalonia
Christian monasteries established in the 11th century
Romanesque architecture in Catalonia